The 1919 Philadelphia Athletics season involved the A's finishing last in the American League with a record of 36 wins and 104 losses. It was their fifth consecutive season in the cellar after owner-manager Connie Mack sold off his star players.

Philadelphia led the AL in fewest runs scored and most runs allowed, and they did so by wide margins. Their team ERA was 4.26, nearly a full run higher than the second worst team in the league that year. The A's team batting average of .244 was the lowest in both leagues. The pitching staff pitched only one shutout in the entire season.

In July 1919, a newspaper reported, "Veteran Harry Davis has been coaxed out of his retirement and has been made assistant manager of the Athletics." Although Connie Mack was the team's manager, the report said, "Mack hereafter will devote most of his time to business affairs of the club" and that the understanding was that Davis "really is in full charge of the team."

Regular season

Season standings

Record vs. opponents

Notable transactions 
 June 13, 1919: Roy Grover was traded by the Athletics to the Washington Senators for Harry Thompson.

Roster

Player stats

Batting

Starters by position 
Note: Pos = Position; G = Games played; AB = At bats; H = Hits; Avg. = Batting average; HR = Home runs; RBI = Runs batted in

Other batters 
Note: G = Games played; AB = At bats; H = Hits; Avg. = Batting average; HR = Home runs; RBI = Runs batted in

Pitching

Starting pitchers 
Note: G = Games pitched; IP = Innings pitched; W = Wins; L = Losses; ERA = Earned run average; SO = Strikeouts

Other pitchers 
Note: G = Games pitched; IP = Innings pitched; W = Wins; L = Losses; ERA = Earned run average; SO = Strikeouts

Relief pitchers 
Note: G = Games pitched; W = Wins; L = Losses; SV = Saves; ERA = Earned run average; SO = Strikeouts

Awards and honors

League top ten finishers 
Rollie Naylor
 #3 in AL in losses (18)

Scott Perry
 #4 in AL in losses (17)

See also
List of worst Major League Baseball season records

References

External links
1919 Philadelphia Athletics team page at Baseball Reference
1919 Philadelphia Athletics team page at www.baseball-almanac.com

Oakland Athletics seasons
Philadelphia Athletics season
Oakland